Jürgen Pauritsch (2 May 1977) is an Austrian former cyclist. He won the Austrian National Road Race Championships in 2001.

References

External links
 

1977 births
Living people
Austrian male cyclists
Sportspeople from Graz